Brooklyn David Anthony Genesini (born 12 December 2001) is an English professional footballer who plays as a right-back for Danish 1st Division club Næstved Boldklub, on loan from AFC Bournemouth.

Career

AFC Bournemouth
Born in Yeovil, Genesini started his footballing career with the Brazil Soccer School before joining AFC Bournemouth. He spent time on loan at Poole Town and was in Bournemouth's squad which went to Portugal for pre-season training in 2022.
On 23 August 2022, Genesini debuted for Bournemouth during a 2–2 win on penalties over Norwich City in the League Cup second round, scoring the equaliser in the game. Genesini had been on the pitch for one minute when he scored Bournemouts's second goal in the 92nd minute from Dominic Sadi's assist.

Loan to Næstved
On 1 September 2022, Genesini was sent on a season-long loan to Danish 1st Division club Næstved. He made his Næstved debut three days later, replacing Mads Agger in the 80th minute of a 3–0 home win over Vendsyssel FF. On 9 October 2022, he scored his first goal for the club, securing a 1–1 draw in injury time against HB Køge, coached by former Liverpool player Daniel Agger.

Career statistics

Club

References

External links
Profile at the AFC Bournemouth website

Living people
2001 births
English footballers
English expatriate footballers
Association football defenders
AFC Bournemouth players
Poole Town F.C. players
Næstved Boldklub players
Southern Football League players
Danish 1st Division players
People from Yeovil
Expatriate men's footballers in Denmark
English expatriate sportspeople in Denmark